Founded in 2002, Grandstream Networks is a manufacturer of IP voice and video communications equipment, video surveillance, gateways and analog telephone adapters (ATAs), and Asterisk-based IP-PBX appliances. Grandstream supplies small and medium businesses and consumers with open-standard SIP-based products.

Grandstream Networks is headquartered in Boston, Massachusetts, and has offices in Plano, Texas, Los Angeles, California in the US, in Casablanca in Morocco, Valencia, Venezuela, and in Shenzhen, China.

The company's products are listed on its web site.

References

Grandstream GXV3275 Android Videophone Wins Gold for Unified Communications Innovation at 2014 Golden Bridge Awards

Grandstream UCM6100 series IP PBX Appliance Receives 2014 Internet Telephony Product of the Year Award

Grandstream GXP2200 - Product of the Year, 2012

Grandstream's GXP2200: Just Like Your Android Smartphone

Grandstream Networks GXP2200 Recognized in Best VoIP CPE Category at 2013 ITSPA Awards

Telecommunications equipment vendors
Videotelephony
VoIP companies of the United States
Technology companies based in the Boston area
Telecommunications companies based in Massachusetts